The Love Trap is a 1923 American silent drama film directed by John Ince and starring Bryant Washburn, Mabel Forrest, and Wheeler Oakman.

Synopsis
A judge's daughter agrees to go with her fiancée to a roadhouse. However, he is murdered there by his abandoned wife and she is left facing black due to the potential scandal.

Cast

Preservation
A print of The Love Trap is held by the Cinémathèque québécoise of Montreal, Canada.

References

Bibliography
 Munden, Kenneth White. The American Film Institute Catalog of Motion Pictures Produced in the United States, Part 1. University of California Press, 1997.

External links

1923 films
1923 drama films
1920s English-language films
American silent feature films
Silent American drama films
American black-and-white films
Films directed by John Ince
1920s American films